Miguel Luís Müller (born February 14, 1961) is a former Brazilian football player.

Playing career
In 1992, Müller joined new Japanese league, J1 League club Gamba Osaka. He played many matches as forward and scored 3 goals in 1992 J.League Cup. However Gamba finished at the 8th place of 10 clubs. In 1993 season, he played as midfielder and scored many goals in J1 League first season. He left the club end of 1993 season.

Club statistics

References

External links

1961 births
Living people
Brazilian footballers
J1 League players
Gamba Osaka players
São Paulo FC players
Santos FC players
Associação Portuguesa de Desportos players
Brazilian expatriate footballers
Expatriate footballers in Japan
Association football midfielders